Nicole ("Nicky") Simone Tellier-Koolen (born 1 December 1972 in Aldershot, Hampshire, United Kingdom) is a former field hockey midfield player from the Netherlands, who played a total number of 53 international matches for the Dutch National Women's Team, in which she scored two goals. She made her debut on 1 February 1995 in a friendly against South Africa (0–3), and won the bronze medal with Holland at the 1996 Summer Olympics.

References
 Dutch Hockey Federation

External links
 

1972 births
Field hockey players at the 1996 Summer Olympics
Dutch female field hockey players
Living people
Olympic field hockey players of the Netherlands
Olympic bronze medalists for the Netherlands
Olympic medalists in field hockey
Medalists at the 1996 Summer Olympics
HGC players
20th-century Dutch women
21st-century Dutch women